Los Berros may refer to:

Los Berros, California
Arroyo Los Berros
Parque Los Berros